Mercedes-Benz Algeria Ltd is a Joint ventures between the German Daimler AG and Algerian automotive industry (EDIV)  founded in 2012, with headquarters in Tiaret, Rouiba, and Constantine, in Algeria.

History
Daimler entered the Algerian market and established Mercedes-Benz Algeria Ltd in 2014.the venture created in July 2012 composed of three main shareholders, namely the Company of the development in the automotive industry (EDIV) coming under the National Defence Ministry (34%) and SNVI (17%). The second shareholder is represented by the Emirati investment fund "Aabar" (49%). German group Daimler AG is considered as the technological partner.

Brand’s manufacturing facilities
The main factory of Mercedes in Algeria is in Rouiba, near Algiers, where heavy duty trucks and buses are manufactured. Models include:
 Zetros 1833 (4x4) - 4,000 to 6,000 kg payload
 Zetros 2733 (6x6) - 7,000 to 10,000 kg payload
 Actros
 Atego
 Axor
 Unimog

Other major facilities across Algeria
 Tiaret (Sprinter, Class G factory)
 Constantine EMO (Engines factory for all the models)

Models

Assembled
Mercedes-Benz G-Class 4x4 and 6x6
Mercedes-Benz Sprinter
Mercedes-Benz Zetros
Mercedes-Benz Actros

References

External links
  

 
Truck manufacturers of Algeria
Vehicle manufacturing companies established in 2012
Car manufacturers of Algeria
2012 establishments in Algeria
Companies based in Constantine, Algeria
Algiers Province
Economy of Constantine, Algeria
Defence companies of Algeria
Government-owned companies of Algeria
Algeria–Germany relations